Maar Shuhur is a Syrian village located in the Hama Subdistrict of the Hama District in Hama Governorate. According to the Syria Central Bureau of Statistics (CBS), Maar Shuhur had a population of 5,595 in the 2004 census.

References 

Populated places in Hama District